Glushkovka is a rural locality (a khutor) in Starooskolsky District, Belgorod Oblast, Russia. The population was 206 as of 2010. There are 3 streets.

Geography 
Glushkovka is located 43 km southeast of Stary Oskol (the district's administrative centre) by road. Krutoye is the nearest rural locality.

References 

Rural localities in Starooskolsky District